Rangas or Rangkas is an extinct West Himalayish language spoken by the Rangkas people of Uttarakhand, India. The Rangkas joined the Kumaoni people and shifted to their language. There is currently an ethnic population of about 1,000 people.

Rangas was spoken in Dharchula and Munsiyari tehsils (facing the Nepal border along the Mahakali valley), Johar Valley, Pithoragarh District, Uttarakhand, India.

References

Extinct languages of Asia
West Himalayish languages